WCPH (1220 AM, "Southeast Tennessee's Oldies Station") is a radio station broadcasting an oldies format. Licensed to Etowah, Tennessee, United States, the station is currently owned by George C. Hudson, III.

References

External links

CPH
Oldies radio stations in the United States
McMinn County, Tennessee
Radio stations established in 1959